Fish Farm Mounds State Preserve is a  archaeological mound group containing Native American burials in the U.S. state of Iowa. It is located within the larger Fish Farms Mounds Wildlife area, a state owned hunting area a few miles south of New Albin, just inland from the Upper Mississippi River in Allamakee County.

History
This prehistoric cemetery was acquired by the state in 1935 as a donation from the Fish family. It became an  archaeological state preserve in 1968. It was listed on the National Register of Historic Places in 1988.

It is located in the Driftless Area of Iowa, a region which escaped being glaciated during the last ice age, near the mouth of the Upper Iowa River.

See also
List of Registered Historic Places in Iowa
Upper Mississippi River National Wildlife and Fish Refuge
Iowa archaeology

References
"Fish Farm Mounds", Iowa Department of Natural Resources, Retrieved July 15, 2007

Mounds in Iowa
Native American history of Iowa
Archaeological sites on the National Register of Historic Places in Iowa
Iowa state preserves
Cemeteries on the National Register of Historic Places in Iowa
Protected areas established in 1935
Protected areas of Allamakee County, Iowa
Driftless Area
National Register of Historic Places in Allamakee County, Iowa